Wiretapper is a 1955 crime drama biopic directed by Dick Ross, written by John O'Dea, and starring Bill Williams, Georgia Lee and Douglas Kennedy. The scenario of the film was based on a true story of Jim Vaus Jr.

Plot 
Jim Vaus returns from the war and marries Alice. He struggles to make a living. He was hired by Charles Rumsden to fix a doorbell, and realizes that his client is a mob boss. Alice discovers the source of Jim's income and their relationship was expired and strained to the breaking point. She forces Jim to attend a Billy Graham's Los Angeles Crusade, in her attempt to save their marriage and Jim's soul.

Scenario 

During the late 1940s, Jim Vaus Jr. worked for the police and for mobster Mickey Cohen. The story of Jim Vaus was described in magazines: Time, Life and Reader’s Digest. Jim Vaus described his own story in his autobiography Why I Quit Syndicated Crime (1951). This autobiography was used by John O'Dea for a film scenario. In 2007 Will Vaus, son of Jim, published book My Father Was a Gangster.

Cast 
 Bill Williams as Jim Vaus Jr.
 Georgia Lee as Alice Park Vaus
 Douglas Kennedy as Charles Rumsden
 Phil Tead as Mr. Wiggins – Postman
 Stanley Clements as Tony
 Ric Roman as Nick Castro
 Richard Benedict as Romato
 Paul Picerni as Herbie
 Steve Conte as Henchman
 Melinda Plowman as Helen Park – Kid Sister
 Billy Graham as himself (uncredited)

See also 
 List of Billy Graham's crusades

References

External links 
 
 

1955 films
1950s English-language films
1950s crime drama films
American crime drama films
Biographical films about gangsters
Billy Graham
Films directed by Dick Ross (director)
1950s American films
American black-and-white films